Pavel Mitrenga is a Bulgarian professional vert skater. Mitrenga turned professional in 2007 with a Gold medal in Tehachapi California.

Best Tricks Flatspin 900, McTwist 720

Vert Competitions 
2019 - Grap Contest, Rome, Italy, 1st place   
2018 - Taunton Blade Bash, Taunton, United Kingdom, 1st place  
2017 - British Inline Championships, Corby, United Kingdom, 3rd place
2016 - European Inline Vert Championships, Hertogenbosch, Nederlands, Finals, 2nd place 
2016 - European Inline Vert Championships, Modena, Italy, 3rd place 
2016 - European Inline Vert Championships, Barcelona, Spain, 2nd place
2016 - UHL, Las Vegas, USA, 3rd place  
2016 - British Inline Championships, Corby, United Kingdom, 4th place
2015 - European Inline Vert Championships Finals, Barcelona, Spain, 2nd place 
2015 - Bunker Contest, Rome, Italy, 3rd place
2014 - European Inline Vert Championships Finals, Barcelona, Spain, 4th place   
2014 - European Inline Vert Championship, San Marino, San Marino, 3rd place
2013 - European Inline Vert Championship, San Marino, San Marino, 2nd place
2012 - European Inline Vert Championships, Copenhagen, Denmark, 4th place 
2012 – Chewits Xtreme-, Birmingham United Kingdom, 2nd place
2012 – KIA Asian X games, Shanghai, China, 6th place
2011 – European Inline Vert Championships Finals, Moscow, Russia 3rd place
2011 – LKXA Barcelona Extreme, Best trick, Barcelona, Spain, 1st place
2011 – LKXA Barcelona Extreme, Highest Air, European Inline Vert Championships Finals, 1st place
2011 – KIA Asian X games, Shanghai, China, 9th place
2010 – Montana Spring Sessions III, Montana, Bulgaria, 2nd place
2009 – European Challenge, Berlin, Germany, 5th place
2009 – Montana Spring Sessions II, Montana, Bulgaria, 1st place
2008 – European Challenge, Berlin, Germany, 2nd place
2008 – Montana Spring Sessions I, Montana, Bulgaria, 2nd place
2007 – European Challenge, Berlin, Germany, 4th place
2007 – American Inline League- World Championship Finals, Tehachapi, California, USA– 1st place
2007 - BTC European Inline Vert Championship, Montana, Bulgaria, 2nd place
2006 – LG Action Sports Finals in Amateur Finals, Dallas (Texas), USA, - 7th Place
2006 - VIVATEL European Inline Vert Championships, Montana, Bulgaria, 3rd place
2006 - Rennes Sur Roulettes, Rennes, France, 7th place
2005 - Nova Gorica Inline Vert Competition, Nova Gorica, Slovenia, 4th place

References

External links
team-disaster.com
espn.go.com
sofiaecho.com
team-disaster.com
team-disaster.com
joyplayground.com
japanontop.com

1986 births
Living people
Vert skaters
X Games athletes